The Korean Presbyterian Church is a Reformed Presbyterian denomination in South Korea. It was formed because of a split within the Presbyterian Church in Korea (HapDong). Three small denominations united to form this church. It has 345,000 members and 425 congregations. It accepts the Westminster Confession.

References 

Presbyterian denominations in South Korea
Christian organizations established in 1984
1984 establishments in South Korea